Bomet Constituency was a former electoral constituency in the Rift Valley Province of Kenya. It was divided into Bomet East Constituency and Bomet Central Constituency.

Members of Parliament

Members of Parliament

Wards

References 

Bomet County
Constituencies in Rift Valley Province
1963 establishments in Kenya
Constituencies established in 1963
Former constituencies of Kenya